WFLT (1420 AM) is a radio station broadcasting an Urban Gospel format. Licensed to Flint, Michigan, it first began broadcasting as WAMM in 1955.

As WAMM, 1420 AM was the area's premier African-American-oriented R&B station for years. The station also provided an early on-air job for future American Top 40 host Casey Kasem (who moved on to WJBK in Detroit and then to Los Angeles). Though primarily targeted at black listeners, WAMM had many white listeners as well.

In the fall of 1979, WDZZ-FM signed on as Flint's first urban FM station and quickly became a ratings success.  WAMM never recovered and adopted Al Ham's Music of Your Life format in early 1981, changing its calls to the current WFLT.  The station soon switched to religious programming and was purchased in 1990 by the Christian Evangelical Broadcasting Association, the current owners, who converted the station back to its African-American-oriented roots, but this time as the successful gospel-music station that it still is today.

References
Michiguide.com - WFLT History

External links
WFLT Facebook Page

FLT
Radio stations established in 1955
Gospel radio stations in the United States
1955 establishments in Michigan